The Hearts of Lonely People is the first and only EP by American experimental rock supergroup Isles & Glaciers. The record was released on March 9, 2010, through Equal Vision Records, sold exclusively through Hot Topic stores and online retailers. A remix version of the EP was released in 2014.

Vocalist Craig Owens confirmed in late 2010 that Isles & Glaciers was a "one time thing side project", making this the only release by the band.

Track listing

Personnel
Isles & Glaciers
 Craig Owens – vocals
 Jonny Craig – vocals
 Mike Fuentes – drums, percussion
 Vic Fuentes – vocals, guitars, bass
 Matt Goddard – bass
 Nick Martin – guitars, vocals
 Brian Southall – guitars, programming, keyboards, synthesizers

Production
 Casey Bates – producer

Artwork
 Drew Roulette

Charts

References

External links
The Hearts of Lonely People at Equal Vision Records

2010 debut EPs
Isles & Glaciers albums
Equal Vision Records EPs